The brown falcon (Falco berigora) is a relatively large falcon native to Australia and New Guinea.

A number of plumage morphs occur, with the primary distinction being between the pale morph and the dark morph. Both morphs usually have dark brown upper parts and wing coverts. Dark morph birds have predominantly dark under parts, although some light streaking is common. Pale morph birds have white underparts that are varyingly streaked with brown, sometimes heavily so. Pale individuals may also have prominently white under tail coverts and these may be diagnostic. A distinctive aspect of their behaviour is shown in the breeding season when Brown Falcons make a loud, high pitched, cackle call (like a laying hen) and screeching while in flight.

The species name berigora has Aboriginal origins.

Description
They are found in light and dark forms and a variety of intermediates. Animals typically have red-brown heads with narrow black streaks with a light crown and off-white chin. Wings are a spotted red-brown with dark brown quills. Beaks are light blue/grey; eyes are brown. The falcons make a loud cackle call uttered frequently.

Breeding and habitat
Brown falcons breed from June to November, usually in an old nest of a larger passerine or another hawk species; they occasionally nest in hollow limbs of trees. The brown falcon lays between two and five eggs that have red and brown spots and blotches.

Subspecies
 F. b. novaeguineae : central and eastern New Guinea and coastal northern Australia
 F. b. berigora : Australia (except coastal north) and Tasmania

Diet
The brown falcon eats small mammals, including house mice. They also eat young rabbits in the summer. It also eats small birds, lizards, snakes, and a variety of invertebrates, particularly caterpillars, grasshoppers, crickets, and beetles. Insects form the bulk of the animals' diets during winter and the falcons often chase the insects on the ground.

Behaviour
Brown falcons and other Australian firehawks have been observed picking up sticks with flames and dropping them to spread fires and prey on escaping animals.

References

Further reading
Birds of The World by Colin Harrison and Alan Greensmith
Complete Book of Australian Birds Reader's Digest

Gallery

brown falcon
Birds of Australia
Birds of New Guinea
Diurnal raptors of Australia
brown falcon
Articles containing video clips
Firehawks